Alfred Edward Durrant VC ISM (4 November 1864 – 29 March 1933) was an English recipient of the Victoria Cross, the highest and most prestigious award for gallantry in the face of the enemy that can be awarded to British and Commonwealth forces.

Details
He was 35 years old, and a private in the 2nd Battalion, The Rifle Brigade (Prince Consort's Own), British Army during the Second Boer War when the following deed took place on 27 August 1900 at the Battle of Bergendal, South Africa, for which he was awarded the VC:

He later achieved the rank of lance-corporal. His Victoria Cross is displayed at the Royal Green Jackets (Rifles) Museum, Winchester, England.

References

Monuments to Courage (David Harvey, 1999)
The Register of the Victoria Cross (This England, 1997)
Victoria Crosses of the Anglo-Boer War (Ian Uys, 2000)

External links

Location of grave and VC medal (N. London)
 

1864 births
1933 deaths
Rifle Brigade soldiers
British recipients of the Victoria Cross
Second Boer War recipients of the Victoria Cross
British Army personnel of the Second Boer War
British Army personnel of the Mahdist War
People from Westminster
British Army recipients of the Victoria Cross